Bonnyville Beach is a summer village in Alberta, Canada. It is located in the Municipal District of Bonnyville No. 87.

Demographics 

See also 
List of communities in Alberta
List of summer villages in Alberta
List of resort villages in Saskatchewan

References

External links 

1958 establishments in Alberta
Summer villages in Alberta